The Armscor M1700 is a compact, bolt-action hunting rifle chambered for the .17 HMR cartridge. Originally designed for hunting, like its predecessor the Armscor M1600, it is also used for pest-control. Its light weight (6 lb) and short length (40.5 in) make it a comfortable weapon to shoot up to and beyond 300 feet. It comes in either a blue or stainless steel finish, a wood stock, has a 5-round internal magazine, and a thumb-operated trigger block device for a safety. It comes standard with fiber optics front sights and adjustable rear sights and can be mounted with a scope.

References 

Bolt-action rifles